Borboropsis is a genus of flies in the family Heleomyzidae. There are at least four described species in Borboropsis.

Species
These four species belong to the genus Borboropsis:
B. fulviceps (Strobl, 1898) i c g
B. puberula (Zetterstedt, 1838) i c g b
B. steyskali (Mathis, 1973) i c g
B. yakunoana Sasakawa, 2004 c g
Data sources: i = ITIS, c = Catalogue of Life, g = GBIF, b = Bugguide.net

References

Further reading

 

Heleomyzidae
Articles created by Qbugbot
Taxa named by Leander Czerny
Sphaeroceroidea genera